Ammerer Bed Company (Betten Ammerer in German) is an Austrian family business in the eighth generation. The enterprise is active in sleeping systems, textile arrangements and lingerie.
 
Ammerer services include curtain needlework, biological bed cleaning, mattress delivery and mattress disposal, monogram embroidering, spatial planning in 3-D and the organisation of wedding tables.

Historical 
In 1763 Leopold Ammerer married into a “Posementierbetrieb” (a weavers-craft) in “Ried im Innkreis” and attained the market rights. With his wife Mechtildis he founded Ammerer. 
In 1816 the parent company at the main square of Ried im Innkreis was acquired successfully by the second generation. Today the house accommodates the business including logistics, marketing and PR.
In 1848 the third generation continued textile distribution. 
In 1949 the sixth generation of “Ammerers” moved the enterprise main focus to “Braunau am Inn” and founded branches in Salzburg, Mattighofen and in the Bavarian region. The outbuilding in Ried (today: main square #29) was acquired.
In 1981 the headquarters shifted back to Ried. Today the seventh generation is in charge.

Expansion 
There were two main phases of expansion:
 In the 1950s the family business was shifted to Braunau am Inn, Upper Austria. Afterwards branches were founded in Mattighofen, Salzburg and in the Bavarian region. 
 The seventh generation shifted the company headquarters back to Ried in the Innkreis. Since the 1980s the company management enforced a massive expansion: branches were founded in Schärding, Griekirchen, Kirchdorf am Inn, Gmunden, Mauthausen, Ottensheim and Leonding.
By takeover of the company “Betten Kastner” in 1998 additional locations were established in Linz, Salzburg and Innsbruck.

The shop in Innsbruck was closed after some years because of the geographical distance to the headquarters. With the exception of the shift in Salzburg all locations are in Upper Austria.

References

External links 
 Official website (in German)

Manufacturing companies of Austria
Companies established in 1763
Economy of Upper Austria